Gaia Realini (born 19 June 2001) is an Italian professional racing cyclist, who currently rides for UCI Women's WorldTour Team .

Major results

Cyclo-cross

2019-2020
 2nd Citta Di Jesolo 
 3rd National Under-23 Championships
 3rd Saccolongo 
 3rd Fae' Di Oderzo
2020-2021
 2nd National Under-23 Championships
2021–2022
 1st Brugherio
 2nd Illnau 
 2nd Citta Di Jesolo 
 3rd Cremona

Road
2021
 Giro Toscana Int. Femminile
1st  Mountain Classification 
9th Overall
 10th Grand Prix Féminin de Chambéry
2022
 1st Mountain Classification Giro Toscana Int. Femminile
 5th Memorial Monica Bandini 
2023
 1st Trofeo Oro in Euro 
 2nd Overall UAE Tour
1st Youth Classification

References

External links

2001 births
Living people
Italian female cyclists
Cyclo-cross cyclists